Journal of Intercultural Communication Research is a peer-reviewed academic journal covering qualitative and quantitative research that focuses on interrelationships between culture and communication. The journal is published by Routledge on behalf of the World Communication Association and the editor-in-chief is Stephen Croucher.

Abstracting and indexing 
The journal is abstracted and indexed in Communication and Mass Media Complete.

External links 
 
 World Communication Association

Taylor & Francis academic journals
English-language journals
Communication journals
Triannual journals
Publications established in 1972